Spanish Civil War Republican ship classes is a list of ship classes used by the Spanish Republicans during the Spanish Civil War.

Battleships 
 España-class battleship - Republicans had one ship of the Jaime I class which they acquired at the start of the conflict.

Cruisers 
 Almirante Cervera-class cruiser - Spanish Republican Navy operated two ships of the Class Libertad and Miguel de Cervantes.
 Blas de Lezo-class cruiser - Spanish Republican Navy operated one ship of class Méndez Núñez.

Destroyers 
 Churruca-class destroyer (1927) - All ships of this Class served in the Spanish Republican Navy at some time during the Spanish Civil War.
 Alsedo-class destroyer - Two ships of this Class served with the Republicans Alsedo and Lazaga.

Auxiliary crusiers 

 List of auxiliary and merchant cruisers

Submarines 

 List of submarines of the Spanish Navy
 Spanish B-class submarine
 Spanish C-class submarine (Example Spanish submarine C-3)

References 

Spanish Republican ships of the Spanish Civil War
Spanish Republican ships of the Spanish Civil War